Adrian Guerra (born in Las Palmas de Gran Canaria) is a Spanish film producer. He is known mostly for his collaborations with Rodrigo Cortes. He is currently at his production company "Nostromo". He is also spearheading a project to develop Spain's largest virtual film studio, to be called "Orca Studios".

Filmography
 Maquillando: Los cronocrímenes, (2008, short)
 Cómo se hizo: Los cronocrímenes, (2008, short)
 Buried, (2010)
 Guest, (2010)
 Apartment 143, (2012)
 Red Lights, (2012)
 Grand Piano, (2013)
 The Gunman, (2015)
 Cómo Sobrevivir a una Despedida, (2015)
 Palm Trees in the Snow, (2015)
 Penny Dreadful, (2016, TV, 6 episodes)
 The Invisible Guest, (2016)
 Inside, (2016)
 The Invisible Guardian, (2017)
 The Titan, (2018, executive)
 Down a Dark Hall, (2018)
 Life Itself, (2018, executive)
 Paradise Hills, (2019)
 The Kill Team, (2019)
 Wasp Network, (2019, executive)
 The Legacy of the Bones, (2019)
 The Occupant, (2020)
 Offering to the Storm, (2020)
 The Minions of Midas, (2020, TV, executive)

References

Spanish film producers
Year of birth missing (living people)
Living people